On Top of the Covers is the seventh studio album by American rapper T-Pain. It was released on March 17, 2023, through Nappy Boy Entertainment and Empire Distribution. It is a covers album, and was his first record in over four years, following 2019's 1UP.

Background 
T-Pain said in a press release about the album: “This covers album has been years in the making. … It got put on hold for a bit, but now that I’m independent, I’m able to do whatever I want to do through Nappy Boy Entertainment and this is something I’ve felt strongly about for a long time. These songs are not what you’d expect when you hear that T-Pain is doing a covers album and that is what I think is cool about it.”

T-Pain began working on On Top of the Covers in 2019 following his appearance and win on The Masked Singer. The project serves as T-Pain showcasing his natural singing voice and deviating from his normal style of heavy Auto-Tune.

Supporting tour 
In support of On Top of the Covers, T-Pain performed three sold-out shows at The Sun Rose in Los Angeles, CA from March 17 to March 19. The shows consisted of T-Pain performing tracks from the new record as well as some of his greatest hits.

Track listing

Notes 
 "A Change is Gonna Come" is a cover of Sam Cooke's 1964 song of the same.
 "Don't Stop Believin'" is a cover of Journey's 1981 song of the same name.
 
 "Skrangs (in K Major sus)" is an instrumental track.
 "Stay with Me" is a cover of Sam Smith's 2014 song of the same name.
 
 "That's Life" is a cover of Frank Sinatra's 1966 rendition of the song.
 "War Pigs" is a cover of the band Black Sabbath's 1970 song of the same name.

References

2023 albums
T-Pain albums
Nappy Boy Entertainment albums